USS Neosho (AO-143) was the lead ship of her class of fleet oilers of the United States Navy, in service from 1954 to the early 1990s.

The fourth Neosho was laid down 15 August 1952 by the Bethlehem Shipbuilding Corporation's Fore River Shipyard at Quincy, Massachusetts, and named Neosho on 29 September 1953. AO-143 was commissioned on 24 September 1954.

Service history

United States Navy, 1954–1978
Neosho was the first of a class of U.S. Navy fleet oilers designed to combine speed and large cargo capacity for underway replenishment. She entered service at Norfolk, Virginia, in the Atlantic Fleet on 8 December 1954. A unit of Service Forces, Atlantic Fleet, she operated along the U.S. East Coast and in the Caribbean until 7 September 1955, when she got underway for her first Mediterranean deployment.

After that initial deployment, Neosho rotated regularly between the United States Sixth Fleet and the United States Second Fleet. During her second 6th Fleet deployment in autumn 1956, she supported units of the Sixth Fleet as they stood by in case they were called on to intervene in the Suez Crisis and the tense period which followed.

In August–September 1958 she joined Task Force 88 for Operation Argus, making three nuclear weapons tests in the South Atlantic. Her commanding officer served as Commander Task Group 88.3, the Mobile Logistics Group, consisted of: Neosho, equipped with USAF MSQ-1 radar and communication vans, USS Salamonie (AO-26), and assigned destroyers.

In the fall of 1962 she provided logistical support to the ships during the Cuban Missile Crisis enforcing the Naval Quarantine of Cuba. From Apr until July 1964 she had a complete overhaul in Baltimore MD dry dock. Less than three years later, in 1965, she serviced Atlantic Fleet ships during the political turmoil in the Dominican Republic, which later led to the United States 1965 Occupation of the Dominican Republic.

In January 1968, Neosho emerged from overhaul at the Norfolk Naval Shipyard at Portsmouth, Virginia, to commence another three year employment cycle beginning with refresher training and local operations, followed by two seven month Mediterranean tours sandwiching duty with the 2nd Fleet, and ending, in late 1970, with another overhaul. After routine support operations with the Second and Sixth Fleets, Neosho entered a brief overhaul at Portsmouth Navy Shipyard, Virginia. On 1 February 1972, Neosho supported Operation Springboard in the Puerto Rican Operating area, returning to Norfolk in early March prior to deploying to the Sixth Fleet in April.  In the Mediterranean, Neosho conducted about 100 refueling at sea, with port visits to Palma de Majorca, Naples, Athens, Ville de France, and Barcelona.

Military Sealift Command, 1978–1992
Neosho was decommissioned on 25 May 1978, and placed in service with the Military Sealift Command as USNS Neosho (T-AO-143), continuing her service with a civilian crew. She was placed out of service in 1992, and struck from the Naval Vessel Register on 16 February 1994.

Disposal
Neosho was transferred to the United States Maritime Administration (MARAD) on 1 May 1999 for lay up in the National Defense Reserve Fleet, James River, Fort Eustis, Virginia. The ship was returned to U.S. Navy custody six years later and sold for scrapping on 2 February 2005. The scrapping was completed at International Shipbreaking of Brownsville, Texas on 8 November 2005.

References

External links 

 
 USS Neosho (AO-143) Veteran's website

 

Neosho-class oilers
Ships built in Quincy, Massachusetts
1953 ships